Angel was a group from Degerfors in Sweden, breaking through with their 1991 chart success Sommaren i city.

History 

On 2 Augusti 2007, the band appeared during the Stockholm Pride schlager evening, performing the songs "Sommaren i city" and "Venus Butterfly". A "Sommarkrysset" appearance, aired over TV4, was done on 25 August 2007.

The girls came from Degerfors and Karlskoga.

In 1992, the band released the album Äventyr i natten, and participated at Melodifestivalen with the song Venus Butterfly. Originally, Anna Åkesson was the vocalist. Linda Jansson later was one of three cowriters of the song När vindarna viskar mitt namn, which won Melodifestivalen 2000, performed by Roger Pontare.

Members
Linda Jansson (now Dahl) - vocals, keyboard
Jessica Larsson (now Wagnsson) - bass
Maria Zaring (now Skaug) - guitar 
Linda Gustavsson - drums

Discography 

 Äventyr i natten (1992)

Citations

External links 

 

Swedish pop music groups
Melodifestivalen contestants of 1992